Nileas Kamarados (1847 in Bosporus – 1922 in Istanbul), his father, Antonis, and his grandfather, Constantinos, escaped the massacre of Chios and set up a trading empire in Russia. They later returned to Asia Minor. He was an influential cantor in byzantine music and invented his own notational system based on the Byzantine and Armenian systems his tutors taught him.

1874 births
1922 deaths
19th-century Greek male singers